This article is about the particular significance of the year 1955 to Wales and its people.

Incumbents
Archbishop of Wales – John Morgan, Bishop of Llandaff
Archdruid of the National Eisteddfod of Wales – Dyfnallt

Events
17 March – In the Wrexham by-election, brought about by the death of Labour Party Member of Parliament (MP) Robert Richards, who had held the seat since 1935, James Idwal Jones holds the seat for Labour with a majority of nearly 11,000 votes.
18 April–28 May – Charles Evans leads the mountaineering expedition that conquers Kanchenjunga.
6 August – Usk Reservoir completed for Swansea water supply.
31 October – The A48 road bridges over the River Neath at Briton Ferry (six years in the building) are officially opened by the Minister of Transport.
3 December – The Farmers Union of Wales breaks away from the National Farmers Union.
20 December – Cardiff becomes the official capital of Wales.

Arts and literature
The Gold Medal for Architecture is introduced to the National Eisteddfod.
Bertrand Russell retires to Plas Penrhyn, Penrhyndeudraeth.
The Guild for the Promotion of Welsh Music is founded.

Awards

National Eisteddfod of Wales (held in Pwllheli)
National Eisteddfod of Wales: Chair – Gwilym Ceri Jones, "Gwrtheyrn"
National Eisteddfod of Wales: Crown – W. J. Gruffydd, "Ffenestri"
National Eisteddfod of Wales: Prose Medal – M. Selyf Roberts, Deg o'r Diwedd
Emyr Humphreys wins the Somerset Maugham Award for Hear and Forgive.

New books

English language
Kingsley Amis – That Uncertain Feeling
(Edwin) Stuart Evans – Elegy for the Death of a Clown (poem)
Elisabeth Inglis-Jones – The Story of Wales
T. E. Lawrence – The Mint (posthumously published)
Dylan Thomas – A Child's Christmas in Wales (posthumously published)
R. S. Thomas – Song at the Year's Turning (poems)
Richard Vaughan – Son of Justin

Welsh language
Gwilym Thomas Hughes – Ei Seren tan Gwmwl
Robert Lloyd – Y Pethe
Louie Myfanwy Thomas writing as Jane Ann Jones – Plant y Foty

New drama
Saunders Lewis – Siwan

Music
Grace Williams – Penillion

Film
Stanley Baker plays Richmond in Laurence Olivier's film of Richard III.
The Constant Husband, starring Rex Harrison, with opening scenes filmed on location at New Quay and Aberaeron in 1954, includes some Welsh dialogue.

Broadcasting
The Welsh Home Service becomes available on VHF from Wenvoe

Welsh-language television
January – First televised Welsh-language play, Cap Wil Tomos

English-language television

Sport
Cricket – Wilf Wooller becomes an England Test selector.
Rugby Union
22 January – Ken Jones becomes Wales's most capped player (36) in a game against England.
12 March – Wales beat Ireland 21–3 at the National Stadium, Cardiff.
26 March – Wales win the Five Nations Championship for the fourth time this decade.
BBC Wales Sports Personality of the Year – John Disley

Births
22 January – Clive Griffiths, footballer (died 2022)
30 January – Ian Edwards, footballer 
23 February – Howard Jones, English-born musician of Welsh parentage
4 March – Joey Jones, footballer
17 March – John David Lewis, political scientist and historian
2 May – Peter Sayer, footballer
22 May – Maggie Jones, Baroness Jones of Whitchurch, politician
9 June – Alun Pugh, politician
21 June (in Sunderland) – Janet Ryder, politician
22 June – Green Gartside (Paul Julian Strohmeyer), musician
2 August – Alun Davies, biologist
3 August – Gordon Davies, footballer
4 August – Steve Jones, marathon runner
3 September – Eirian Williams, snooker referee
29 September – Gareth Davies, rugby player 
12 October – Brian Flynn, footballer and manager
17 November – Amanda Levete, architect
7 December – Mihangel Morgan, author and academic
date unknown
Aled Gruffydd Jones, social historian, Librarian of National Library of Wales
Martyn Jones, painter

Deaths
5 January – Douglas Marsden-Jones, Wales and British Lions rugby player, 61
25 January – Robert Dewi Williams, teacher, clergyman and author, 84
26 January – Gwilym Davies, Baptist minister, 75
29 January – Sir Rhys Rhys-Williams, politician, 89
19 March – Tom Evans, Wales international rugby player, 72
2 April – Billy O'Neill, Welsh international rugby player, 76
27 April – Ambrose Bebb, author, 60
19 May – Percy Bush, Wales international rugby union player, 75
21 June – Eric Evans, rugby union player and administrator, 61
13 July – Ruth Ellis, murderer, 28 (hanged)
28 August – Sir Lewis Lougher, businessman and politician, 83
28 September – Lionel Rees, airman, Victoria Cross recipient, 71
14 October – Harry Parr Davies, songwriter, 41
15 October – Thomas Jones (T. J.), founder of Coleg Harlech, 85
30 October – Bert Dauncey, Wales international rugby player, 83
1 November – Ronw Moelwyn Hughes, politician, 58
15 December – V. E. Nash-Williams, archaeologist, 58
date unknown – Melbourne Johns, munitions worker and wartime secret agent, 55

See also
1955 in Northern Ireland

References